Wayraperú is a Peruvian airline based at Jorge Chávez International Airport in Lima Peru, that operated between March and November 2006, then again since May 2018. In January 2018 the carrier announced the intention to recommence services. Currently, Wayraperú only offers charter services.

History

Early operations

At the end of 2004, the news of the creation of an airline was announced to the media. Wayraperú was the result of the joint venture between the Brazilian company OceanAir and Fondo de Inversiones Sustentables, run by entrepreneur Pedro Koechlin. At its peak the airline operated to 14 destinations, with three Fokker 100s for American Airlines. On March 20, 2006, it formally began operations, inaugurating from Lima to Arequipa.

On November 27, 2006, all flights had been suspended, citing poor management creating an "existential" company crisis. The airline had, according to September 2006 figures, 9% of the Peruvian market with flights to Arequipa, Iquitos, Tacna, Pucallpa, Talara, Tarapoto, Trujillo and Tumbes.

Recommencing operations
On January 30, 2018, Wayraperú announced they would restart operations after 12 years. The announcement came after the airline was due to acquire two Fokker 70s formerly from KLM Cityhopper, who retired the aircraft on October 28, 2017.

Wayraperú has an active air services license from the Ministry of Transportation and Communications of Peru that allows it to carry out domestic passenger charter flights from its main international base in Lima, as well as Iquitos, Tarapoto, Pucallpa and Chachapoyas. However, the airline does not yet have an air operator's certificate.

On May 24, 2018, the airline recommenced operations using a Fokker 70 from Tarapoto to Juan Simons Vela Airport on a reconnaissance flight, with airline employees and the mayor of Rioja, Mercedes Torres, on board. The airline reportedly will also begin twice-weekly flights between Rioja and Lima from June 2018, which could have increased frequency according to demand.

According to the airline's official web page, it currently offers only charter services.

Destinations

Fleet

Current fleet
As of December 2020, the Wayraperu fleet includes the following aircraft:

Former fleet
When Wayraperu ceased operations in November 2006, it operated the following aircraft:

See also
List of airlines of Peru

References

External links
Current Facebook official page
 Official website

Avianca
Airlines of Peru
Airlines established in 2005
Companies of Peru